Nightfall is the ninth studio album by American country music group Little Big Town. It was released on January 17, 2020, by Capitol Nashville, and was self produced by Little Big Town with major production assistance from Daniel Tashian and Ian Fitchuk. It includes the singles "Over Drinking", "The Daughters", and "Wine, Beer, Whiskey". It was nominated for the Grammy Award for Best Country Album and both "The Daughters" and "Sugar Coat" were nominated for the Grammy Award for Best Country Duo/Group Performance.

Critical reception

Nightfall received positive reviews from music critics, respectively. At Metacritic, which assigns a normalized rating out of 100 to reviews from mainstream critics, the album has an average score of 74 based on 4 reviews, indicating "generally favorable reviews."

The album was placed fourth on the Billboard (magazine) list of Top Country Albums of 2020. Billboard editors describe the band as reaching “substantive emotional richness that few groups can touch” on the album.

Stephen Thomas Erlewine of AllMusic wrote that "The labor is evident, particularly in the careful construction of the compositions and the subtle shading on individual tracks" and "it's music for meditative mornings or for afternoons in need of a dose of consolation and comfort." He also compared the band's sound favorably to Fleetwood Mac.

Commercial performance
Nightfall debuted at No. 1 on Top Country Albums with 31,000 equivalent album units, 26,000 in of which are in traditional album sales. As of March 2020, it has sold 43,800 copies in the United States.

Track listing

Personnel
Adapted from AllMusic

Little Big Town
 Karen Fairchild – vocals
 Kimberley Schlapman – vocals
 Philip Sweet – vocals, guitar
 Jimi Westbrook – vocals, guitar

Additional musicians
 Avery Bright – viola
 Tofer Brown – bass guitar, celeste, guitar, acoustic guitar, baritone guitar, electric guitar, Hammond B-3 organ, percussion, piano, programming, synthesizer, background vocals
 Jacob Bryant – trumpet
 Zach Casebolt – violin
 Matt Combs – violin
 Spencer Cullum – pedal steel guitar
 Ian Fitchuk – bass guitar, drums, acoustic guitar, keyboards, percussion
 Cara Fox – cello
 Jesse Frasure – programming
 Tim Galloway – guitar, acoustic guitar
 Dan Grech-Marguerat – programming
 Jon Green – guitar
 Jedd Hughes – guitar, electric guitar, background vocals
 Claire Indie – cello
 Katelyn Kelly – violin
 Hillary Lindsey – acoustic guitar
 Todd Lombardo – acoustic guitar
 Sean McConnell – acoustic guitar, programming, background vocals
 Hubert Payne – drums, percussion
 K.S. Rhodes – string conductor
 Daniel Tashian – bass guitar, baritone guitar, electric guitar, lap steel guitar, mandolin, programming
 John Thomasson – bass guitar
 Akil Thompson – guitar, Hammond B-3 organ, keyboards
 Foy Vance – piano
 Evan Weatherford – guitar, slide guitar
 Kristin Weber – violin
 Kris Wilkinson – viola

Charts

Weekly charts

Year-end charts

References

2020 albums
Little Big Town albums
Capitol Records albums